Furto di sera bel colpo si spera (i.e. "Theft in the evening, a big coup hopefully") is a 1973 Italian heist-comedy film written and directed by Mariano Laurenti and starring Pippo Franco.

Plot

Cast 

 Pippo Franco as Quinto 
 Giancarlo Prete as  Armando Ciccarelli
 Laura Troschel as  Lidia (credited as Costanza Spada)
  Thomas Rudy as  Euforia
 Piero Vida as  Marcello
  Monica Monet as  Nicoletta
 Aldo Giuffrè as  Count Nuvolucci
 Memmo Carotenuto as  Quinto's father
 Umberto D'Orsi as Commendatore
 Andrea Aureli as  Receiver of stolen goods
 Ignazio Leone

See also
 List of Italian films of 1973

References

External links

1973 comedy films
1973 films
Italian comedy films
Films directed by Mariano Laurenti
Italian heist films
1970s heist films
Films set in Rome
Films shot in Rome
1970s Italian films